In This Life is the second studio album by American country music artist Collin Raye. Its title track was Raye's second song to reach Number One. "That Was a River", "Somebody Else's Moon" and "I Want You Bad (And That Ain't Good)" were also released as singles. "Big River" is a cover of a Johnny Cash song, while "Let It Be Me" is a cover of a pop standard originally recorded by Betty Everett and Jerry Butler.

Track listing

Personnel
 Sam Bush – mandolin
 Joe Chemay – background vocals
 Garth Fundis – background vocals
 Rob Hajacos – fiddle
 John Hobbs – piano
 Kraig Hutchens – electric guitar
 Gene LeSage – background vocals
 Brent Mason – electric guitar
 Weldon Myrick  – steel guitar
 Dave Pomeroy – bass guitar
 Collin Raye – lead vocals, background vocals
 Harry Stinson – background vocals
 Steve Turner – drums
 Billy Joe Walker Jr. – acoustic guitar
 Sammy Wray – background vocals

strings performed by the Nashville String Machine arranged by John Hobbs

Chart performance

References

1992 albums
Epic Records albums
Collin Raye albums
Albums produced by Garth Fundis